Alan Josué Cervantes Martín del Campo (born 17 January 1998) is a Mexican professional footballer who plays as a defensive midfielder for Liga MX club Santos Laguna.

Club career

Youth
Cervantes joined Guadalajara's youth academy in 2013. He continued through Chivas Youth Academy successfully going through U-15, U-17 and U-20 youth system. Until being given the chance to join first division team Club León making his professional debut under Javier Torrente.

León (loan)
Cervantes joined Leon on a one-year loan without purchase option. He made his professional debut coming in as a substitute against Atlas on 22 July 2017 ending in a 3–0 loss

Guadalajara
Cervantes returned from his loan in December for the 2018 season.

International career

Youth
Cervantes captained all of the national team's matches in the 2017 FIFA U-20 World Cup in South Korea.

Cervantes was included in the under-21 roster that participated in the 2018 Toulon Tournament, where Mexico would finish runners-up.

Cervantes participated at the 2020 CONCACAF Olympic Qualifying Championship, appearing in four matches, where Mexico won the competition.

Senior
On 3 July 2021, Cervantes made his senior national team debut in a 4–0 victory against Nigeria, coming in as a substitute in the 81st minute for Érick Gutiérrez.

Career statistics

Club

International

Honours
Guadalajara
CONCACAF Champions League: 2018

Mexico Youth
CONCACAF U-17 Championship: 2015
CONCACAF Olympic Qualifying Championship: 2020

References

External links
 
 

1998 births
Living people
Mexican footballers
Footballers from Guadalajara, Jalisco
Association football midfielders
Mexico under-20 international footballers
Mexico international footballers
C.D. Guadalajara footballers
Club León footballers
Santos Laguna footballers
Liga MX players
2021 CONCACAF Gold Cup players